Murtan may refer to:
 Murtan, Iranshahr
 Murtan, Sarbaz
 Murtan Rural District, in Sarbaz County